Negri is a commune in Bacău County, Western Moldavia, Romania. It is composed of six villages: Brad, Călinești, Mâgla, Negri, Poiana and Ursoaia.

References

Communes in Bacău County
Localities in Western Moldavia